Kupartiya is a small Aboriginal community, located 130 km south east of Fitzroy Crossing in the Kimberley region of Western Australia, within the Shire of Halls Creek.

Native title 
The community is located within the registered Gooniyandi Combined 2 (WAD6008/00) native title claim area.

Town planning 
Kupartiya Layout Plan No.1 has been prepared in accordance with State Planning Policy 3.2 Aboriginal Settlements. The Draft Layout Plan map-set is online.

References

External links

 Native Title Claimant application summary

Aboriginal communities in Kimberley (Western Australia)